The 1925 Arkansas Razorbacks football team was an American football team that represented the University of Arkansas in the Southwest Conference (SWC) during the 1925 college football season. In its fourth year under head coach Francis Schmidt, Arkansas compiled a 4–4–1 record (1–2–1 against SWC opponents), finished in fifth place in the SWC, and outscored opponents by a total of 95 to 62.

Schedule

References

Arkansas
Arkansas Razorbacks football seasons
Arkansas Razorbacks football